Kalmashevo (Qalmaş) is a rural locality (a selo) in Yeremeyevsky Selsoviet, Chishminsky District, Bashkortostan, Russia. The population was 686 as of 2010. There are 11 streets.

Geography 
Kalmashevo is located 14 km northwest of Chishmy (the district's administrative centre) by road. Yeremeyevo is the nearest rural locality.

References 

Rural localities in Chishminsky District